"1942" is a hip hop song by American rapper G-Eazy, featuring guest vocals from rappers Yo Gotti and YBN Nahmir. The artists co-wrote the song with singer Jeremih, as well as its producers Hitmaka, Smash David and SkipOnDaBeat. It was released by RCA Records on April 13, 2018, as the second single for the soundtrack to the film Uncle Drew (2018).

Music video 
The music video premiered on May 17, 2018 on G-Eazy's Vevo account.

Composition
"1942" features a "hypnotic and bouncy production" from Hitmaka and "a catchy hook" provided by Gotti. Lyrically, G-Eazy raps about ignoring the rules and doing whatever he wants.

Personnel
Credits adapted from Tidal.
 Hitmaka – production
 Smash David – production
 SkipOnDaBeat – production
 Jeremih — songwriting
 Jaycen Joshua – mix engineering
 David Nakaji – engineering assistance
 Ben Milchev – engineering assistance
 Dakari – record engineering
 Brian White – record engineering

Charts

Certifications

Release history

References

2018 songs
2018 singles
G-Eazy songs
RCA Records singles
Songs written by Yo Gotti
Yo Gotti songs
YBN Nahmir songs
Songs written by Smash David
Songs written by G-Eazy
Songs written by Hitmaka